Ron Sanchez is a Dominican college basketball coach and current head coach for the Charlotte 49ers men's basketball team.

Playing career
Sanchez played collegiately at SUNY Oneonta where he was a two-time SUNYAC all-conference selection, and SUNYAC Player of the Year for the 1995-96 season. He was inducted into the Red Dragons' athletic hall of fame in 2007.

Coaching career
After graduation, Sanchez assisted his alma mater for three seasons, before taking an assistant coaching position at SUNY Delhi from 1999 to 2001. While completing his master's degree studies, Sanchez served as a volunteer assistant coach at Indiana under Mike Davis and was on staff during the Hoosiers' national runner-up season in 2002.

After Indiana, Sanchez joined Dick Bennett's staff at Washington State as director of basketball operations, and was elevated to assistant coach when Tony Bennett took over the helm of the Cougars, where he was a part of the team's 2007-08 Sweet 16 squad. Sanchez followed Bennett to Virginia, served as assistant coach from 2009 to 2018, and was part of three ACC regular season championship seasons, two ACC tournament championships, and six NCAA tournament teams including an Elite Eight run in the 2016 NCAA tournament.

On March 19, 2018, Sanchez was named the 11th head coach in Charlotte men's basketball history.

Head coaching record

References

Living people
Charlotte 49ers men's basketball coaches
College men's basketball head coaches in the United States
College men's basketball players in the United States
Dominican Republic men's basketball players
Indiana Hoosiers men's basketball coaches
State University of New York at Oneonta alumni
Virginia Cavaliers men's basketball coaches
Washington State Cougars men's basketball coaches
Year of birth missing (living people)